Amer Jameel  (born 1 July 1945) is a former Iraqi football forward who played for Iraq in 1966. He played in the 1966 Arab Nations Cup.

Honours

Manager
Al-Quwa Al-Jawiya
Iraqi Premier League: 1989–90
Al-Zawraa
Iraqi Premier League: 1998–99

References

Iraqi footballers
Iraq international footballers
Living people
Association football forwards
Al-Zawraa SC managers
Al-Quwa Al-Jawiya managers
Iraqi football managers
1945 births